Leffingwell–Batcheller House is a historic home located at Yonkers, Westchester County, New York. It was designed by noted New York architect R. H. Robertson and built between about 1887 and 1889.  It is a -story, masonry and frame dwelling in the Queen Anne style.  It has a hipped roof with gabled dormers and sheathed in rough-hewn brownstone, pressed and common brick, wood shingle, and wood clapboard.  It features a broad verandah, a two-story rounded bay, and a rounded bay with conical roof.

It was listed on the National Register of Historic Places in 2015.

References

Houses on the National Register of Historic Places in New York (state)
Queen Anne architecture in New York (state)
Houses completed in 1889
Buildings and structures in Yonkers, New York
National Register of Historic Places in Yonkers, New York